David Nelson Crouch (June 18, 1853 in Tennessee – March 5, 1944) of Leola, South Dakota was an Independent member of the South Dakota House of Representatives representing McPherson County from the 42nd House District. He served during the 19th Legislative Session, which ran from 1925 to 1926.

He previously served as a member of the Missouri House of Representatives from 1891 to 1892 representing Sullivan County, Missouri as a Democrat.

References

1853 births
1944 deaths
Members of the South Dakota House of Representatives
Members of the Missouri House of Representatives
People from Sullivan County, Missouri
People from McPherson County, South Dakota
Missouri Democrats
South Dakota Independents